German submarine U-430 was a Type VIIC U-boat of Nazi Germany's Kriegsmarine during World War II.

She carried out no patrols. She did not sink or damage any ships.

She was sunk in northern Germany by US bombs on 30 March 1945.

Design
German Type VIIC submarines were preceded by the shorter Type VIIB submarines. U-430 had a displacement of  when at the surface and  while submerged. She had two shafts and two  propellers.

U-430 was fitted with five  torpedo tubes (four fitted at the bow and one at the stern), fourteen torpedoes, one  SK C/35 naval gun, 220 rounds, and two twin  C/30 anti-aircraft guns. The boat had a complement of between forty-four and sixty.

Service history
The submarine was laid down on 5 October 1942 at the Danziger Werft (yard) at Danzig (now Gdansk), as yard number 131, launched on 22 April 1943 and commissioned on 4 August under Tenente di vascello Mario Rossetto.

She served with the 8th U-boat Flotilla from 4 August 1943 and the 21st Flotilla from 29 September. She was reassigned to the 31st Flotilla on 1 February 1945.

The U-boat was named S-6 after being acquired by the Italian Navy in exchange for some transport ships. She returned to Germany after the Italian surrender where she was renamed U-430.

Fate
The submarine was sunk by US bombs near Bremen on 30 March 1945.

Two men died; the number of survivors is unknown.

References

Bibliography

External links

German Type VIIC submarines
U-boats commissioned in 1943
U-boats sunk in 1945
U-boats sunk by US aircraft
1943 ships
Ships built in Danzig
World War II submarines of Germany
Maritime incidents in March 1945